Francisco Medina (1870-1945)  was an Argentine military man who served as Minister of War during the presidency of José Félix Uriburu.

Biography 
He was born in Buenos Aires, the son of Francisco Medina, born in Montevideo, and Rosa Buasso, daughter of a Genoese family. He was married to Elvira Lamela Canavery, daughter of Lieutenant Colonel Baldomero Lamela Luengo, and Elvira Canavery, belonging to a family of Irish descent.

He was promoted to General de Brigada in 1923 and to General of División in 1929. He spent most of his military career in southern Argentina, where he participated in the last military campaigns of the Conquest of the Desert. 

General Francisco Medina took an active part in the de facto government of José Félix Uriburu and Agustín Pedro Justo.

References

External links 

Bautismos 1869-1871
Francisco Medina (Caras y Caretas)

1870 births
1945 deaths
Argentine people of French descent
Argentine people of Italian descent
Argentine people of Spanish descent
People from Buenos Aires
Argentine Army officers
Argentine generals
Canaveri family